Tom Craine is an English comedian, writer and broadcaster.

As well as performing solo stand up comedy Craine has performed as part of a sketch group called Jigsaw with Dan Antopolski and Nat Luurtsema. Luurtsema and Craine were in a relationship, the break up of which has been the focus of solo shows for both.

He co-wrote the sitcom Josh (TV series) with Josh Widdicombe for the BBC. He co-devised and wrote the panel show Hypothetical for UK TV channel Dave. He has regularly appeared  on Widdicombe’s football nostalgia podcast Quickly Kevin, Will He Score?

He has written regular columns for Cosmopolitan (magazine) called ‘Sex and the Single Guy’ and he used the correspondence from readers he received as the basis for a one man show called ‘Thoughts on Love (By a Man With None of the Answers)’.

For television he has written for Mock The Week, The Last Leg, and 8 out of 10 Cats, he has appeared on Russell Howard’s Good News, Live at the Electric, and Drunk History. He has had a show on Radio X for which ‘Tom Craine’s story show’ was available as a podcast. He has also had shows for BBC Radio Bristol and Phoenix FM and co-presented on BBC Radio Wales with Rhod Gilbert.

Personal life
He is from Bath, Somerset. In childhood he was the lead chorister of Bath Abbey Choir and sang a solo on the 1990 Songs Of Praise Christmas special.

References

English comedians
English writers
English broadcasters